The following is a list of schools that participate in National Association of Intercollegiate Athletics softball, according to NAIA.org. These teams compete for the NAIA Softball Championship. (For schools whose athletic branding does not directly correspond with the school name, the athletic branding is in parentheses.)

Conference affiliations reflect those in the 2023 season. Years of conference changes, indicated in footnotes, reflect softball seasons, which take place in the calendar year after a conference change takes effect.

See also
 List of NCAA Division I softball programs
 List of NCAA Division II softball programs
 List of NCAA Division III softball programs

References

N
NAIA softball